Signal-recognition-particle GTPase is an enzyme with systematic name GTP phosphohydrolase (protein-synthesis-assisting). This enzyme catalyses the following chemical reaction

 GTP + H2O  GDP + phosphate

Enzyme activity is associated with the signal-recognition particle.

See also 
 Signal recognition particle

References

External links 
 

EC 3.6.5